Mountnessing is a village and civil parish in the Borough of Brentwood in south Essex, England. It is situated to the north-east of Brentwood, south-west of Ingatestone. A large proportion of the houses are situated on the Roman Road (formerly the A12 road until the village was bypassed in the 1970s) between Brentwood and Ingatestone. The village is approximately equidistant between the two closest railway stations of Shenfield and Ingatestone.

Amenities
Features of Mountnessing are its windmill and the parish church of St Giles. As well as mountnessing ce primary school. An annual village fete is held in July. In the "Windmill" field there is also a village hall, cricket pitch, football pitches and tennis courts. 
It has three pubs, The George and Dragon, The Plough and the Prince of Wales, a butcher's and a hairdressers.

There is a primary school, Mountnessing C of E, on Roman Road.

St. Giles church is located midway between Mountnessing and Billericay.

Sport
A short-lived greyhound racing track was opened during 1931 at Chain Bridge on the Main London Road. The racing was independent (not affiliated to the sports governing body the National Greyhound Racing Club) and known as a flapping track, which was the nickname given to independent tracks. Racing took place every Saturday at 3pm but did not continue beyond 1932.

References

External links

 Mountnessing Parish Council website

Villages in Essex
Civil parishes in Essex
Borough of Brentwood